Lecanora albella is a species of fungus belonging to the family Lecanoraceae.

It has cosmopolitan distribution.

References

albella
Lichens of Malesia